Puya micrantha is a species in the genus Puya. This species is native to Bolivia.

References

micrantha
Flora of Bolivia